Dervishiya cadambae is a moth in the family Cossidae. It is found in India.

The forewings have a reticulate pattern, which is more expressed on the wing periphery and weakens towards the base. The hindwings are light with a weak reticulate pattern.

The larvae feed on Ficus species, Nauclea cadamba and Tectonia grandis.

References

 , 2006, New Cossidae (Lepidoptera) from Asia, Africa and Macronesia, Tinea 19 (3): 188-213.

External links
Natural History Museum Lepidoptera generic names catalog

Cossinae
Moths described in 1865
Moths of Asia